The Division of Grey is an Australian electoral division in South Australia. The division was one of the seven established when the former Division of South Australia was redistributed on 2 October 1903 and is named for Sir George Grey, who was Governor of South Australia from 1841 to 1845 (and later Prime Minister of New Zealand).

Geography
Since 1984, federal electoral division boundaries in Australia have been determined at redistributions by a redistribution committee appointed by the Australian Electoral Commission. Redistributions occur for the boundaries of divisions in a particular state, and they occur every seven years, or sooner if a state's representation entitlement changes or when divisions of a state are malapportioned.

The division covers the vast northern outback of South Australia.  Highlighting South Australia's status as the most centralised state in Australia, Grey spans , over 92 percent of the state. The borders of the electorate include Western Australia, the Northern Territory, Queensland and New South Wales borders, in addition to much of the southern coastal border. The electorate spans to Marion Bay and Eudunda in the south. The main population centres of the electorate include Ceduna, Port Lincoln, Whyalla, Port Augusta, Roxby Downs, Coober Pedy, Port Pirie, Kadina, Maitland, Orroroo, Booleroo Centre, Peterborough, Burra and Eudunda.

History

When Grey was first created in 1903, it included the Northern Territory and all of northern and western South Australia, down to a line through the Mid North south of Port Pirie.

Grey was held by Labor for much of its history, and was one of the few country seats where Labor usually did well. It remained in Labor hands for all but one term from 1943 to 1993, the only break coming when the Liberals won it during their landslide victory in 1966. For most of that time, it was a fairly safe Labor seat, though it was almost lost in the Coalition landslides in 1975 and 1977.

That changed in 1993, when the retirement of Labor incumbent Lloyd O'Neil, the unpopularity of the state Labor government, and the addition of the Clare Valley at a redistribution enabled Liberal Barry Wakelin become only the second non-Labor member to win the seat in 50 years. That happened even as Labor won another term; it was the first time Labor had won government at an election without winning Grey. However, the election came at a bad time for the state Labor government, which was roundly defeated at the state election later that year in which it lost all but one seat within Grey's borders.

Wakelin was re-elected with a large swing in 1996, and since then the decline in the mining and pastoral vote has made it a fairly safe Liberal seat. While the "Iron Triangle" towns of Whyalla, Port Augusta and Port Pirie still tilt Labor — as they have for more than a century — they are not enough to overcome the increasingly conservative lean in the rest of the seat.

The Liberals consolidated their hold on the seat ahead of the 2004 election when the Yorke Peninsula and the state's upper east, both historically strongly conservative areas, were transferred to Grey from Wakefield. The Liberals suffered a nine-point swing at the 2007 election, but Rowan Ramsey was still able to retain the seat for the Liberals, with 54 percent of the two-party vote.  The seat became secure for the Liberals once again after Ramsey picked up a large swing in 2010, which he consolidated in 2013.

2016 election
South Australian Senator Nick Xenophon confirmed in December 2014 that by mid-2015 the Nick Xenophon Team (NXT) would announce candidates in all states and territories at the 2016 election, with Xenophon citing the government's ambiguity on the Collins-class submarine replacement project as motivation. ABC psephologist Antony Green's 2016 federal election guide for South Australia stated NXT had a "strong chance of winning lower house seats and three or four Senate seats".

Going into the 2016 election, Grey was the second-safest Liberal seat in South Australia; Labor needed a 13-point swing to win it.  A ReachTEL seat-level opinion poll in Grey of 665 voters conducted by robocall on 9 June during the election campaign surprisingly found NXT candidate Andrea Broadfoot leading the Liberals' Ramsey 54–46 on the two-candidate preferred vote. Seat-level opinion polls in the other two rural Liberal South Australian seats revealed NXT also leading in both Mayo and Barker.

Early counting following the poll showed that Broadfoot was a clear second to Ramsey on first preferences, well ahead of the ALP candidate in third place. This meant that the indicative assessment of two-candidate preferred count on election night had been done between the wrong pair, and would need to be redone in the following week to give a clearer indication as to which of Ramsay and Broadfoot would win the seat after distributing all preferences.  While Broadfoot was ahead with as much as 80 percent of ballots counted, she ultimately lost to Ramsey on Family First preferences. Ultimately, Ramsey suffered a swing of 11.6 percent after preferences were counted, which made Grey the most marginal Liberal seat in the state and one of the most marginal Coalition-held rural seats in the nation.  On a "traditional" two-party basis (Labor vs. Liberal), however, Grey was still a fairly safe Liberal seat.

Members

Election results

References

 ABC profile for Grey: 2016
 Poll Bludger profile for Grey: 2016
 AEC profile for Grey: 2016

External links
 SA boundary map, 2001: AEC
 SA boundary map, 1984: Atlas SA

Electoral divisions of Australia
Constituencies established in 1903
1903 establishments in Australia